Galeotto is an Italian name used in the Middle Ages. In modern Italian language, it means prisoner.

People 
Galeotto is the name of:
 Galeotto Franciotti della Rovere (1471–1507), Italian Roman Catholic bishop and cardinal
 Galeotto Graziani (died 1522), Italian monk and the first bishop of Sansepolcro
 Galeotto I Malaspina (died 1367), Italian judge and nobleman
 Galeotto I Malatesta (1299–1385), Italian condottiero, who was lord of Rimini, Fano, Ascoli Piceno, Cesena and Fossombrone
 Galeotto I Pico (1442–1499), Italian condottieri and nobleman, lord of Mirandola and Count of Concordia
 Galeotto II Pico della Mirandola (1508–1550), Italian condottiere
 Galeotto Manfredi (1440–1488), Italian condottiero and lord of Faenza
 Galeotto Roberto Malatesta (1411–1432), Italian condottiero

Other uses 
 Prencipe Galeotto,  subtitle of The Decameron, in reference to Prince Galehaut

References